James E. Hundstad is a Democratic member of the South Dakota Senate, representing the 2nd district since 2004. Previously he was a member of the South Dakota House of Representatives from 2000 through 2004.

External links
South Dakota Legislature – Jim Hundstad official SD Senate website

Project Vote Smart – Senator James E. Hundstad (SD) profile
Follow the Money – Jim Hundstad
2008 2006 2004 2002 2000 Senate campaign contributions

Democratic Party South Dakota state senators
Democratic Party members of the South Dakota House of Representatives
1941 births
Living people
Politicians from Aberdeen, South Dakota